Enter The Meatmarket is the second studio album by American DJ Armand Van Helden. This album is more hip hop oriented than its predecessor.

Track listing
All Editions
 Push'em Up
 Hot Butter
 Blakpeoplez
 Daaboodaa Munks
 Crooklyn Anthem
 Ultrafunkula
 Hood Movie Stars
 Word Up Doc!
 This Is It
 Out Of Frame
 Reservoir Dogs
 6 Minutes Of Funk
 Bounce
 Hey Yah Heh

Release history

References

1997 albums
Armand Van Helden albums
Ruffhouse Records albums